Guédelon Castle is a castle currently under construction near Treigny, France. The castle is the focus of an experimental archaeology project aimed at recreating a 13th-century castle and its environment using period techniques, dress, and materials.

In order to fully investigate the technology required in the past, the project is using only period construction techniques, tools, and costumes. Materials, including wood and stone, are all obtained locally. Jacques Moulin, chief architect for the project, designed the castle according to the architectural model developed during the 12th and 13th centuries by Philip II of France.

Construction started in 1997 under Michel Guyot, owner of Château de Saint-Fargeau, a castle in Saint-Fargeau 13 kilometres away. The site was chosen according to the availability of construction materials: an abandoned stone quarry, in a large forest, with a nearby pond.

History
In 1979, French entrepreneur Michel Guyot purchased the ruins of the Château de Saint-Fargeau and began restoring it with profits raised on-site.
In late 1995, a study by Guyot's staff revealed the medieval foundations beneath the current, brick ruins, complete with a hypothesized plan of the original castle. After some consideration, Guyot rebuilt the existing castle, but began assembling funds and experts – and opening negotiations with the French government – to build a new castle.
Over five months in 1997, Guyot raised €400,000 from the European Union, local and the central French governments, and commercial entities.

A former sandstone quarry was chosen as the site of Guédelon Castle because of its relative elevation and abundance of local natural resources, which would have been expensive to transport in the Middle Ages.
The castle location is in a woodland, two hours south of Paris, near Treigny. The ceremonial first stone was laid on 20 June 1997, 
and permission for the construction was received from the commune of Treigny on 25 July 1997.

After ground-breaking mid-1997 through early 1998, the site was cleared and the first workshops erected.
By 1998 the castle perimeter had been built up to a metre (3 ¼ feet) in height, following which Guédelon was opened to the public.

By 2014, the castle was attracting about 300,000 visitors annually,
and had annual revenue of about three million euros.

The techniques redeveloped for Guédelon Castle are being used in the reconstruction of Notre-Dame cathedral after its catastrophic 2019 fire.

Media
Guédelon Castle appeared in the 2004 documentary Europe in the Middle Ages.
In November 2014 the castle was featured in the series, Secrets of the Castle, in which the project was described as "the world's biggest archaeological experiment".

Construction images

See also 
 Campus Galli – a comparable project to construct a faithful medieval town with a monastery, based on the Plan of Saint Gall; in Meßkirch, Germany
Castell Coch – a 19th-century Gothic revival castle
 Castell Henllys – an archeological site accompanied by reconstruction roundhouses
 Ozark Medieval Fortress – another, similar (but halted) castle project in Arkansas, USA
 Castle Drogo – an Edwardian imitation castle in England
 Basilica of Saint-Denis, reassembly of the north tower and its spire entirely financed by the site visits
 French frigate Hermione (2014) – a project to construct a faithful 18th-century frigate
 List of castles in France

References

Sources

Further reading 
 

 

 

 

 

  — Interview with Guédelon's co-founder and CEO, Maryline Martin

External links 

 Official website

Castles in Bourgogne-Franche-Comté
Buildings and structures under construction in France
Stone buildings
Experimental archaeology
Tourist attractions in Yonne